GAA Confidential (Everything you never knew you wanted to know about Gaelic games) is a humorous sports book by Darragh McManus, an Irish journalist and author. It was published by Hodder Headline Ireland in April 2007.

The book takes a broad look at the Gaelic Athletic Association, and attendant Irish culture, and is divided into sections: The Introduction, The History, The Set-up, The Games, The Competitions, The Fans, The Media, The Arts & Culture, The Look, and The Other Stuff That Wouldn't Fit Anywhere Else.

GAA Confidential received generally favourable reviews on publication, including: “Perhaps the funniest, most cultured book ever written about our national sports” (Irish Independent); “Hilarious…an eclectic collection of anecdotes by an immensely talented writer” (Sunday Independent); “Flip, smart, ironic and breezy…by turns a miscellany, polemic, social history and work of satire” (Sunday Business Post); “A book that every GAA fan should have…read it” (www.anfearrua.ie); "Guaranteed to raise a smile” (Sunday Tribune). It was nominated for the 2007 William Hill Irish Sportsbook of the Year award.

Darragh McManus currently writes freelance for the Irish Independent and The Guardian.

References

External links
 GAA Confidential website
 Darragh McManus's articles in The Guardian

2007 non-fiction books
Comedy books
Gaelic games books